Erich Julius Eberhard von dem Bach-Zelewski (born Erich Julius Eberhard von Zelewski; 1 March 1899 – 8 March 1972) was a high-ranking SS commander of Nazi Germany. During World War II, he was in charge of the Nazi security warfare against those designated by the regime as ideological enemies and any other persons deemed to present danger to the Nazi rule or Wehrmachts rear security in the occupied territories of Eastern Europe. It mostly involved atrocities against the civilian population. In 1944 he led the brutal suppression of the Warsaw Uprising. At the end of 1941 the forces under von dem Bach numbered 14,953 Germans, mostly officers and unteroffiziere, and 238,105 local "volunteers" (most war crime victims were murdered by local collaborators under Nazi command.)

Despite his responsibility for numerous war crimes and crimes against humanity, Bach-Zelewski did not stand trial in the Nuremberg trials, and instead appeared as a witness for the prosecution. He was later convicted for politically motivated murders committed before the war and died in prison in 1972.

Biography

Origins and family 
Erich Julius Eberhard von dem Bach-Zelewski was born as Erich Julius Eberhard von Zelewski in Lauenburg on 1 March 1899 to Kashubian parents, Otto Johannes von Zelewski (1859–1911) and Amalia Maria Eveline Schimanski (born 1862). His father, an officer and farmer, was of an impoverished Kashubian family of landed gentry with roots in Seelau. His uncle, Emil von Zelewski, died in 1891 as commanding officer of the Schutztruppe of German East Africa, in fighting the Hehe. The Zelewski family had originally spoken Kashubian and Polish at home and for generations was connected with the Roman Catholic church in Linde, but as an adult Zelewski joined a Protestant church. Since his father had to pay off several siblings, he sold the manor he inherited and became a traveling salesman. Zelewski and his six siblings therefore grew up in relative poverty in Bialla in East Prussia, where he attended an elementary school. When he was twelve, his father died, and the children were placed in foster families. Zelewski was taken in as the foster son of a landowner named Schickfuss in Trebnig. Zelewski attended several high schools, in Neustadt,  Strasburg, and Konitz.

First World War
The outbreak of the First World War came during the school summer holidays of 1914, while Zelewski was staying with his mother in Bialla. He was only fifteen, but in December 1914 he succeeded in enlisting in the Prussian Army, gaining some notoriety as its youngest volunteer. He served throughout the First World War.  In 1915, he was wounded by a bullet in the shoulder and in 1918 suffered a poison gas attack. He was awarded the Iron Cross, Second Class, and later First Class. By the end of the war he had been promoted to Leutnant.

Between the Wars
Following the armistice of November 1918, Zelewski remained in the Reichswehr and fought against the Polish Silesian Uprisings. In 1924, he resigned his army commission (or was discharged) and returned to his farm in Düringshof (now Bogdaniec in the Gorzów Wielkopolski county of Poland). He became a member of the German veterans' organization Der Stahlhelm and also joined the Deutschvölkischer Schutz- und Trutzbund, the largest, most active and most influential anti-Semitic organization in the Weimar Republic. Zelewski enrolled with the border guards (Grenzschutz) the same year.

Zelewski legally added "von dem Bach" to his family name on 23 October 1925. On 28 November 1940, he removed the "Zelewski" part of his surname because of its Polish-sounding origin. Bach-Zelewski manipulated his genealogy numerous times in his career to impress his superiors.

In July 1930, Bach-Zelewski left the Grenzschutz, and joined the Nazi Party. Bach-Zelewski joined the SS on 15 February 1931. He achieved the rank of SS-Brigadeführer on 15 December 1933. During this period he reportedly quarreled with his staff officer, Anton von Hohberg und Buchwald, and allegedly had him killed during the Röhm Putsch in 1934.

A source of considerable embarrassment for him was the fact that all three of his sisters had married Jewish men. After the war, he claimed under interrogation that this had ruined his reputation in the army, forcing him to leave the Reichswehr. 

A Nazi Party member of the Reichstag from 1932–44, Bach-Zelewski participated in the Night of the Long Knives in 1934, using the opportunity to have his rival Buchwald murdered. From 1934 on he served as leader of SS main districts (SS-Oberabschnitten), initially in East Prussia and after 1936 in Silesia. In 1937, he was named Senior SS and Police Leader (HSSPF) in Silesia, and also served as Commander of SS main district South East (SS-Oberabschnitt Südost).

World War II
In November 1939, SS chief Heinrich Himmler offered Bach-Zelewski the post of "Commissioner for the Strengthening of Germandom" in East-Silesia (the Polish territories incorporated into Silesia in 1939). His duties included mass resettlement and the confiscation of Polish private property. By August 1940, some 18,000–20,000 Poles from Żywiec County were forced to leave their homes in what became known as the Action Saybusch (German name for Żywiec).

Bach-Zelewski provided the initial impetus for the building of Auschwitz concentration camp at the former Austrian and later Polish military barracks in the Zasole suburb of Oświęcim due to overcrowding of prisons. The location was scouted by his subordinate Oberführer Arpad Wigand. The first transport arrived at KL Auschwitz on 14 June 1940, and two weeks later Bach-Zelewski personally visited the camp. In June 1941, he resumed his duties as HSSPF in Silesia.

Occupied Soviet Union

During Operation Barbarossa, Bach-Zelewski served as HSSPF in the territory of Belarus. From July to September 1941, he oversaw the murder of Jews in Riga and Minsk by the Einsatzgruppe B, led by Arthur Nebe, also visiting other sites of mass killings such as Bialystok, Grodno, Baranovichi, Mogilev, and Pinsk. Bach-Zelewski regularly cabled to headquarters on the extermination progress; for example, the 22 August message stated: "Thus the figure in my area now exceeds the thirty thousand mark".

In February 1942, he was hospitalized in Berlin for treatment of "intestinal ailments" stemming from opium abuse, and was described as suffering from "hallucinations connected with the shooting of Jews". Before resuming his post in July, Bach-Zelewski petitioned Himmler for reassignment to anti-partisan warfare duty. Von dem Bach was promoted to SS-Obergruppenführer and General of Police on 9 November 1941.

In June 1942, Reinhard Heydrich, acting Reich-Protector of Bohemia and Moravia, was assassinated in Prague. Hitler chose Bach-Zelewski as his replacement, but Himmler protested that he could not be spared due to the prevailing military situation. Hitler relented and appointed Kurt Daluege to the position. Through 1943, Bach-Zelewski remained in command of "anti-partisan" units on the central front, a special command created by Hitler. He was the only HSSPF in the occupied Soviet territories to retain genuine authority over the police after Hans-Adolf Prützmann and Jeckeln lost theirs to the civil administration.

Genocidal tactics
At some time in June 1943, Himmler issued the Bandenbekämpfung (bandit fighting) order, simultaneously announcing the existence of the Bandenkampfverbände (bandit fighting formations), with Bach-Zelewski as its chief. Employing troops primarily from the SS police and Waffen-SS, the Bandenkampfverbände had four principal operational components: propaganda, centralized control and coordination of security operations, training of troops, and battle operations. Once the Wehrmacht had secured territorial objectives, the Bandenkampfverbände first secured communications facilities, roads, railways, and waterways. Thereafter, they secured rural communities and economic installations such as factories and administrative buildings. An additional priority was securing agricultural and forestry resources. The SS oversaw the collection of the harvest, which was deemed critical to strategic operations. Any Jews in the area were rounded up and murdered. Communists and people of Asian descent were murdered presumptively under the assumption that they were Soviet agents. Under Bach-Zelewski, the formations were responsible for the mass murder of 35,000 civilians in Riga and more than 200,000 in Belarus and eastern Poland.

Bach-Zelewski's methods produced a high civilian death toll and relatively minor military gains. In fighting irregular battles with the partisans, his units slaughtered civilians in order to inflate the figures of "enemy losses"; indeed, far more fatalities were usually reported than weapons captured. The German troops would encircle areas controlled by the partisans in a time-consuming manner, allowing real partisans to slip away. After an operation was completed, no permanent military presence was maintained, which gave the partisans a chance to resume where they had left off. Even when successful in pacification actions, Bach-Zelewski usually accomplished little more than to force the real enemy to relocate and multiply their numbers with civilians enraged by the massacres.

Bach-Zelewsky told Leo Alexander:
	 

In July 1943, Bach-Zelewski received command of all anti-partisan actions in Belgium, Belarus, France, the General Government, the Netherlands, Norway, Ukraine, Yugoslavia, and parts of the Bezirk Bialystok. In practice, his activities remained confined to Belarus and contiguous parts of Russia. 

In early 1944, he took part in front-line fighting in the Kovel area, but in March he had to return to Germany for medical treatment. Himmler assumed all his posts.

Warsaw Uprising 

On 2 August 1944, Bach-Zelewski took command of all German troops fighting Bor-Komorowski's Home Army that had staged the Warsaw Uprising. The German forces were made up of 17,000 men arranged in two battle groups: under , and under Heinz Reinefarth – the latter included the Dirlewanger Brigade of convicted criminals. This command group was named after Bach-Zelewski, as Korpsgruppe Bach. Units under his command murdered approximately 200,000 civilians (more than 65,000 in mass executions) and an unknown number of prisoners of war, in numerous atrocities throughout the city.

After more than two months of heavy fighting and the total destruction of Warsaw, Bach-Zelewski managed to take control of the city, committing atrocities in the process, notably the Wola massacre. Bach-Zelewski was awarded the Knight's Cross of the Iron Cross on 30 September 1944. On 4 October 1944, he accepted the surrender of General Tadeusz Bór-Komorowski. Incidentally, during the slaughter and razing of Warsaw, he is alleged to have personally saved Fryderyk Chopin's heart, by taking it for his own collection of curiosities. The recovered heart is held at a Warsaw church.

Last months of the War 

In October 1944, he was sent by Hitler to the Hungarian capital Budapest, where he participated in the fall of Regent Miklós Horthy and his government, and its replacement by the fascist and highly anti-Semitic Arrow Cross Party with their leader Ferenc Szálasi. In particular, he was involved in the persecution of the Hungarian Jews.

In December 1944 he became commander of the XIV SS Corps in the Baden-Baden region and between 26 January and 10 February 1945 of the X SS Corps in Pomerania, where his unit was annihilated after less than two weeks.  He then commanded from 17 February 1945, the Oder Corps under Army Group Vistula.

After the war
After the war in Europe ended, Bach-Zelewski went into hiding and tried to leave the country. US military police arrested him on 1 August 1945. In exchange for his testimony against his former superiors at the Nuremberg trials, Bach-Zelewski never faced trial for any war crimes. Similarly, he never faced extradition to Poland or to the USSR. During his testimony at the Nuremberg trials, Bach-Zelewski stated that he disapproved of Himmler's aim to exterminate 30 million Slavs, but explained it thus: "when, for years, for decades, the doctrine is preached that the Slav is a member of an inferior race and that the Jew is not even human, then such an explosion is inevitable." In saying so, Bach-Zelewski effectively linked the facts of mass murder on the ground to Nazi ideology, and established the connection between the Wehrmacht and the actions of the Einsatzgruppen in the Soviet Union, which turned out to be of great value to interrogators and prosecutors at the Nuremberg Trials. 

Bach-Zelewski left prison in 1949. In 1951, Bach-Zelewski claimed that he helped Hermann Göring commit suicide in 1946. As evidence, he produced cyanide capsules to the authorities with serial numbers not far removed from the one used by Göring. The authorities never verified Bach-Zelewski's claim, and did not charge him with aiding Göring's death. Most modern historians dismiss Bach-Zelewski's claim and agree that a U.S. Army contact within the Palace of Justice's prison at Nuremberg most likely aided Göring in his suicide.

Trials and convictions
In 1951, Bach-Zelewski was sentenced to 10 years in a labor camp for the murder of political opponents in the early 1930s; however, he did not serve prison time until 1958, when he was convicted of killing Anton von Hohberg und Buchwald, an SS officer, during the Night of the Long Knives, and was sentenced to four and a half years imprisonment.

In 1961, Bach-Zelewski was sentenced to life in prison for the murder of six German Communists in the early 1930s. None of the sentences referred to his role in Poland, in the Soviet Union, or his participation in the Holocaust, although he openly denounced himself as a mass murderer. He had at the same time "denounced Himmler’s racism in strong terms, as well as incitement to ‘exterminate "inferior races", possibly to curry favor with prosecutors. Bach-Zelewski died in a Munich prison on 8 March 1972, a week after his 73rd birthday.

Bach-Zelewski gave evidence for the defence at the trial of Adolf Eichmann in Israel in May 1961. His evidence was to the effect that operations in Russia and parts of Poland were conducted by Operations Units of the Security Police and were not subject to the orders of Eichmann's office, nor was Eichmann able to give orders to the officers in charge of these units, who were responsible for the murder of Jews and Gypsies. The evidence was provided at a hearing in Nuremberg in May 1961.

Family life
He married Ruth Apfeld in 1922, had three daughters (Giesele, Ines, Ilse) and three sons (Heinrich, Ludolf, Eberhard). In 1947, while being a prisoner in Nuremberg, he took a Catholic church wedding with his wife. In 1957, Erich's two sons - Heinrich and Eberhard - emigrated to the United States. Eberhard von dem Bach joined the US Army, worked in the army as an organizational commissioner.

References
Notes

Bibliography

 
 
 
 Norman Davies, (2004). Rising '44. The Battle for Warsaw, (1st U.S. ed.), New York: Viking; .
 
 
 Lifton, Robert Jay, The Nazi Doctors (New York: Basic Books 1986), .

External links

 Warsaw Uprising in civilians testimonies from "Chronicles of Terror" database

1899 births
1972 deaths
People from Lębork
People from the Province of Pomerania
German people of Polish descent
German Protestants
Nazi Party politicians
Members of the Reichstag of the Weimar Republic
Members of the Reichstag of Nazi Germany
SS-Obergruppenführer
SS and Police Leaders
20th-century Freikorps personnel
Warsaw Uprising German forces
Einsatzgruppen personnel
Waffen-SS personnel
Perpetrators of World War II prisoner of war massacres
Holocaust perpetrators in Poland
Recipients of the Gold German Cross
Recipients of the clasp to the Iron Cross, 1st class
Recipients of the Knight's Cross of the Iron Cross
German people convicted of murder
German prisoners sentenced to life imprisonment
People convicted of murder by Germany
Prisoners sentenced to life imprisonment by Germany
Prisoners who died in German detention
German Army personnel of World War I
Nazis who died in prison custody